Servance-Miellin is a commune in the department of Haute-Saône, eastern France. The municipality was established on 1 January 2017 by merger of the former communes of Servance (the seat) and Miellin.

See also 
Communes of the Haute-Saône department

References 

Communes of Haute-Saône
Populated places established in 2017
2017 establishments in France